Stephen James Veltman (born August 4, 1969 in Philadelphia, Pennsylvania; later raised in Conroe, Texas U.S.) is a former American "Old School/Mid School" professional Bicycle Motocross (BMX) racer whose prime competitive years were from 1980–1985 and 1987 to 1998. His nickname during the time he first achieved fame as a 12- and 13-year-old was "Spider-Man" due to the posture he had as he speed jumped his bicycle over moguls. He would be tucked all the way back over and just above the rear wheel. His right elbow would be down while his left up as opposed to having them near perfectly level. This along with his red and white Hutch uniform and helmet with mirrored lensed goggles gave an impression of  the comic book superhero Spider-Man swinging on his web. His later moniker "V"-Dog" came into being concurrently with him joining the Vans Racing Team in April 1991. He was also known as "Primetime".


Racing career

Note: Professional firsts are on the national level unless otherwise indicated.

*In the NBL "B" Pro/Super Class/"A" pro (depending on the era); in the ABA "A" pro.
**In the NBL "A" Pro/All Pros/Pro Class/"AA" Pro/"Elite Men"; in the ABA "AA" pro.

Career factory and major bike shop sponsors

Note: This listing only denotes the racer's primary sponsors. At any given time, a racer could have numerous co-sponsors. Primary sponsorships can be verified by BMX press coverage and sponsors' advertisements at the time in question. When possible, exact dates are given.

Amateur
 World of Wheels (bike shop): 1980
 Mongoose (BMX Products) (co-factory): 1980
 Bassett: Early 1981 – November 1981
 Hutch Hi-Performance BMX/Products: November 27, 1981 – mid-1986. Richard Hutchins, the owner of Hutch Hi-Performance, first saw Steve (after Steve's father Jim Veltman pointed him out) at a 1981 ABA National in Ohio. He won his class. Hutchins next saw him at the 1981 ABA Grand National pre-race. He showed enough talent to give him a uniform to wear at the Grand Nationals proper the next two days. After Steve placed fourth in 12 Expert, he gave him a formal and full sponsorship immediately afterward. Veltman's first race for Hutch was the ABA Winter Shootout Triple pointer in Jersey City, New Jersey, on December 13, 1981. Veltman took a year hiatus from the National BMX racing circuit starting in mid-1986 (sometime after the Murray World Cup) due to burnout, lacking the will to win and craving the desire to do other things. He returned in mid-1987 after that desire to complete returned.
 McDonald's: Mid-1987 – late October 1988. McDonald's, like its competitor Hardee's, fielded a BMX team but the McDonald's team lasted two years compared to the one the Hardee's team lasted. McDonald's shut down its BMX effort in October 1988.
 U.S. Boss Racing Products: Late October 1988 – December 1989. Veltman turned pro with this sponsor.

Professional
 U.S. Boss Racing Products: Late October 1988 – December 1989. Shortly after McDonald's discontinued its BMX effort, Veltman joined U.S. Boss. The ABA Fall Nationals on October 29 in Orlando, Florida, was the first race with his new sponsor.
 L&S (Lucia & Son) Racing: January 1990 – April 1991. L&S was started by the same person who previously owned U.S. Boss Racing Products, Carlo Lucia.
 Vans (Van Doran Rubber Company): April 1991-March 1992. Veltman started a brief retirement to concentrate on school.
 ODI (Ornate Design, Inc*):  November 26, 1992 – November 29, 1992. He showed up at the 1992 ABA Grandnationals in an ODI jersey. It was his first race since his approximately eight-month hiatus to concentrate on school. This sponsorship lasted the duration of the 1992 ABA Grandnationals.
 U.S. Boss Racing Products: November 29, 1992 – December 1995. Veltman during the 1995 season went into a brief retirement. He returned to the racing circuit at the beginning of 1996.
 Torker: January 1996-January 1998
 Next: Late August 1998 – late November 1999

 Magna: Late November 1999 – 2001
 ODI: 2003 This company started out making Christmas ornaments but switched to making bicycle grips and later grips for power tools as well as BMX and skateboarding accessories.
 Answer Products: 2003
 GT (Gary Turner) Bicycles: 2004

Career bicycle motocross titles

Note: Listed are District, State/Provincial/Department, regional, national, and international titles in italics. "Defunct" refers to the fact of that sanctioning body in question no longer existing at the start of the racer's career or at that stage of his or her career. Depending on point totals of individual racers, winners of Grand Nationals do not necessarily win National titles. Series and one off Championships are also listed in block.

Amateur
National Bicycle Association (NBA)
 None
National Bicycle League (NBL)
 None
American Bicycle Association (ABA)
 1980 Texas State Champion
 1981 Texas District 3 (TX-3) No.1
 1982 12 Expert North Central Gold Cup Champion
 1982 13 Expert Grandnational Champion
 1982 National No. 1 Amateur
 1982 National No. 1 Cruiser
 1982 13 Expert Jag World Champion (ABA sanctioned)
 1983 14 Expert and 13-13 Cruiser International Super Bowl of BMX Champion.*
 1985 15 Expert and 15 Cruiser Winter Season TX-3 District Age Group (DAG) No.1**

*The ABA International  of BMX was a series of 33 qualifying races around the country culminating in a Championship race in Toledo, Ohio. To qualify, a racer had to participate in one of the 33 races in the series. Then the qualifiers participate in three double-point races in Ohio a day before the finals. The main event qualifiers will then be trimmed down to the sixteen riders with the most points via tabulation. Those 16 will make up the semis for the triple-point  race event itself with the qualifiers from those semis racing for the title in the main. Each  main amateur or pro was run three times to determine the champion in his or her class.

**DAG District Age Group, NAG-National Age Group
In 1985 the ABA experimented with dividing the district points season from one year lasting from January 1 to December 31 to three four-month-long periods at which a racer could earn a plate number for that time period and/or their age group and could race the rest of the year with it. The experiment lasted only for a year before the ABA reverted to a single year long points gathering season in 1986.
United States Bicycle Motocross Association (USBA)
 1985 16 Cruiser Grandnational Champion
International Bicycle Motocross Federation (IBMXF)
 1982 12 Expert World Champion
 1982 13 & Under Cruiser World Champion
 1989 18 to 24 Cruiser World Champion.

Other titles
 1981 12 Expert Jag World Champion (USCF sanctioned)

Professional
National Bicycle Association (NBA)
 None
National Bicycle League (NBL)
 1991 20" Pro Grandnational Champion
American Bicycle Association (ABA)
 1990 Pro U.S Gold Cup West Champion
 1990 Pro Super Cup Champion
 1993 National No.1 Pro. He won a black 1993 Ford Ranger

United States Bicycle Motocross Association (USBA)
 None
International Bicycle Motocross Federation (IBMXF)
 None
Pro Series Championships

Notable accolades
 He was the first ABA racer, amateur or professional, to take two ABA No. 1 national titles in the same year: 1982 in Amateur 20" and Amateur Cruiser Class.
 He displayed something of an entrepreneurial spirit at a young age (13 years old at the time) by manufacturing and marketing "Rad Kaps", dice cubes converted into bicycle tire valve caps which sold briskly.
 He also displayed innovation as the inventor of the Posi-Stop brake cable guide. The Posi-Stop was a combination seat clamp and caliper brake cable guide that was supposed to improve the performance of such brakes. It was later manufactured and sold by Oddessey under the "Pozi-Stop" (note adjusted spelling) name.
 He became part of the venerable Wheaties advertising campaign on August 14, 1983, by being featured on the box of their cereal product, joining a long line of sports legends such as Lou Gehrig, Babe Ruth, Babe Didrikson, Jackie Robinson, Wilt Chamberlain and Caitlyn Jenner (then Bruce).
 He was named the fourteenth of the 25 hottest amateurs in BMX racing in a 1984 survey conducted by BMX Plus! for the opinions of four prominent figures in BMX: Two racers, Brent Patterson and Mike Poulson; and two team officials: Dr. Gary Scofield of GT, Howard Wharthon of Diamond Back.
 Named one of BMX Action's "Terrible Ten" of top amateurs and future pros for 1988
 Name by the ABA's BMXer magazine as the 1993 Golden Crank "Pro of the Year" Award.
 Named 1994 "Racer of the Year" by BMX Plus!. No voter break down given.
 He set and held the record for most pro wins in a season in the ABA at 14 in 1993 until John Purse broke it in 1998.
 In 1996, he set and held the World Bunny Hop record at 46 inches, overtaking fellow racer Brian Lopes's record. The Bunny Hop is basically a high jump on a bicycle. Like in a Track and field high jump a take-off ramp is not used and elevation is accomplished purely by muscle power and momentum. A jump is attempted either with either a rolling launch or at a near standstill. The front end of the bicycle is pulled up as one jumps up on the pedals. When the body is fully erect as if standing the handle bars of the pulled up front end is at waste level. At this juncture the rider pulls up on the bar further as his momentum is still going up. A moment later the rider pushes forward on the bars and brings his legs up to the point that his thighs are parallel to the ground. If done properly the rear wheel of the bicycle should come up with his legs and he should end up in a fully tucked position as if going over a speed jump, but in mid air; in Veltman's case 46 inches in mid-air. The whole exercise only last about a second and a half.

*Due to a change of ownership of BMX Plus! in 1983, no May issue was published that year.

Significant injuries
 Was laid up with mononucleosis for nearly two months after the 1988 ABA Grand Nationals. The 1989 ABA Winter Nationals held on February 18 and 19 in Chandler, Arizona was his first race back.
 Broke collarbone at the ABA Mid America Nationals in Lincoln, Nebraska, on March 1, 1992 (day 2). Laid up two months. This was the first significant BMX related injury he had ever had. Prior to this incident, he had never broken a bone racing.
 Was laid up for three months with severe back problems beginning in with his injury at the Silverdollar Nationals in Reno, Nevada on January 8 or 9, 1994. He tore tendons and tissue in his lower spine. His first race back was the ABA U.S. Nationals in Clovis, California on March 11, 1994. 
 He separated his right wrist at the ABA Empire National in Kingston, New York on August 20, 1994. He crashed leading the first pro main on day 1, "endoing" (his front wheel hitting the front side of the jump incorrectly) on a set of triple moguls. He was laid up until just before the ABA Gold Cup East race in Blue Springs, Missouri on September 25, 1994. However, he would suffer another injury immediately.
 He suffered a snapped interior cruciate ligament with possible cartilage damage in his knee during a practice session two days before the ABA Gold Cup East race in Blue Springs, Missouri on September 23, 1994. He had to have surgery with a donor ligament to replace his snapped one. In total he was out with injuries for six consecutive months until the week of March 9, 1995, and returned to national competition for the ABA Winternationals in Scottsdale, Arizona, on March 18, 1995.

Racing habits and traits

Miscellaneous

Post BMX career
Steve Veltman is currently a Personal Trainer in the San Diego, California area. He still occasionally races BMX in ABA Veteran Pro class. He recently came in third place on Friday, November 24, 2006 during the ABA Grand National.

BMX press magazine interviews and articles
"Hutch's #1 Hero" ABA Action March 1982 Vol.6 No.3 pg.16
"Steve Veltman: "V" is for Victory" Bicycle and Dirt March 1983 Vol.1 No.7 pg.41
"Hutch's Steve Veltman: Interview with a National Champion"Super BMX May 1983 Vol.10 No.5 pg.56
"Fast Talk: Steve Veltman" BMX Plus! May 1984 Vol.7 No.5 pg.71 Mini interview.
"New Kids on the Block" Go September 1990 Vol.1 Iss.11 pg.52 A joint interview article with fellow rookie pros Kenny May and Matt Hadan.
"Young Guns!!!" BMX Plus! October 1990 Vol.13 No.10 pg.64 Joint interview with fellow rookie pros Eric Carter, Tim Hall, Kenny May, and Matt Hadan.
"Steve Veltman and the Art of Rolling" Go July 1991 Vol.2 Iss.9 pg.19 How to article on speed jumping.
"Vans' Grand Slam! Taking a stand on BMX!" BMX Plus! April 1992 Vol.15 No.4 pg.35 Interviews with Steve Veltman and his teammates Terry Tenette, Pete Loncarevich and Racer/Team manager Everette Rosecrans.
"totally mental: Steve Veltman: 1993 aba no.1 pro" American BMXer December 1994 Vol.16 Iss.11 pg.32
"Steve Veltman" Snap BMX Magazine May/June 1997 Vol.4 No.3 Iss.16 pg.30

BMX magazine covers
Bicycle Motocross News:
None
Minicycle/BMX Action & Super BMX:
None
Bicycle Motocross Action & Go:
November 1990 Vol.2 Iss.1 ahead of Billy Griggs, Traves Chipres and Mike King. In insert John Paul Rogers (Go).
BMX Plus!:
August 1990 Vol.13 No.8 behind Greg Hill & Brian Lopes
October 1991 Vol.14 No.10 trailing Gary Ellis, Todd Corbitt & Pete Loncarevich.
December 1993 Vol.16 No.12 behind Danny Nelson (51). In insert freestyler Dave Mirra.
March 1994 Vol.17 No.3 Fourth from right on the starting gate with fellow pros (5) Brian Lopes (first from right), Mike King, Eric Carter (25), Pete Loncarevich (partly obscured on Veltman's right), & and unidentified. In top insert Haro Monocoque BMX racing bicycle.
Total BMX:
March 1983. In insert Brian Patterson.
Bicycles and Dirt:
March 1983 Vol.1 No.7 Inset: Gary Ellis and an unidentified racer.

Snap BMX Magazine & Transworld BMX:

Moto Mag:
None
NBA World & NBmxA World (The official NBA/NBmxA membership publication):
None
Bicycles Today & BMX Today (The official NBL publication under two names):

ABA Action, American BMXer, BMXer (The official ABA publication under three names):
ABA Action November 1981 Vol.5 No.10
ABA Action April 1983 Vol.6 No.3 standing with Brent Patterson, Robert Fehd, Debbie Kalsow and Greg Hill
American BMXer December 1984 Vol.7 No.11
American BMXer December 1994 Vol.16 Iss.11
USBA Racer (The official USBA membership publication:):"

Notes

References

External links
 The American Bicycle Association (ABA) Website.
 The National Bicycle League (NBL) Website.
 JJR BMX website dedicated to the Hutch Hi-Performance BMX bicycle company from 1980 to 1992

1969 births
Living people
American male cyclists
BMX riders